Terry A. Francois ( 1922 – June 9, 1989) was an African American attorney, civil rights activist, and politician. He served as the San Francisco chapter president of the National Association for the Advancement of Colored People and became the first African American to serve on the San Francisco Board of Supervisors.

Biography
Born in New Orleans, Francois obtained his bachelor's degree from Xavier University in 1940. He attended Atlanta University, where he earned a master's degree in business. Francois joined the United States Marine Corps, serving as a platoon sergeant in World War II. After the war, Francois moved to San Francisco, where he attended the University of California, Hastings College of the Law and received his law degree in 1949.

Francois protested unfair practices against blacks in housing. He was elected as the San Francisco chapter president of the National Association for the Advancement of Colored People. He also served on the board of the San Francisco Urban League. In private practice, Francois represented Margherite Mays, the wife of Willie Mays.

Francois was named to the San Francisco Board of Supervisors in 1964 by Mayor John Shelley, becoming the first African American to serve on the board. He was elected to his own term in 1967. He was re-elected in 1971 and again in 1975. After San Francisco transitioned to supervisor elections based on districts, rather than at-large elections, Francois resigned from the board of supervisors in 1978 to return to private practice.

In 1988, he left the Democratic Party, registering with the Republican Party and endorsing George H. W. Bush in the 1988 United States presidential election.

He died of cancer on June 9, 1989, at the age of 67.

Personal life
Francois married Marion Le Blanc in 1947. With his wife, Francois had five children: four sons and a daughter. He had eight grandchildren.

He was Catholic, and helped to lead the Catholic Interracial Council in San Francisco before its demise.

Criticism
Following the end of the Civil Rights Movement and the rise of the Black Panthers, Francois was often criticized for his more lax approach to social issues, especially those affecting the Black community. He was seen by some as more of a White-oriented talking head than a figure fighting forcefully for Black causes.

Legacy
Terry A. Francois Boulevard in San Francisco's Mission Bay neighborhood is named after him.

References

1989 deaths
United States Marine Corps personnel of World War II
African-American people in California politics
Lawyers from New Orleans
Xavier University alumni
Clark Atlanta University alumni
University of California, Hastings College of the Law alumni
San Francisco Board of Supervisors members
California Democrats
California Republicans
United States Marines
Year of birth uncertain
Lawyers from San Francisco
African Americans in World War II
African-American Catholics
Roman Catholic activists
African-American United States Navy personnel